Civvies is a six-part thriller first broadcast on BBC1 on 22 September 1992. The series was written by Lynda La Plante - her first writing contribution for the BBC, after being poached by the BBC following the success of Prime Suspect. The series focuses on Frank Dillon (Jason Issacs), a former Army soldier who finds life outside the army tougher than being in it - and slowly falls under the power of east end gangster Barry Newman (Peter O'Toole), who is looking to hire a trained hitman. The complete series was released on DVD on 3 June 2013 on Acorn Media UK.

Plot
Reconciling the danger and excitement of serving in the elite British Parachute Regiment with life back home with his family does not prove simple for Frank Dillon (Jason Isaacs). An impulsive and aggressive man, he is aware that his pay-off from the army isn't sufficient to secure his future but, like his friends, struggles to find stable employment elsewhere. With no one prepared to take a chance on him, Frank may be powerless to resist the approaches of Barry Newman (Peter O'Toole), an East End gangster who could certainly find a use for a trained killer.

Cast
 Jason Isaacs as Frank Dillon
 Elizabeth Rider as Suzie Dillon
 Caleb Lloyd as Kenny Dillon
 Bobby Coombes as Phil Dillon
 Lennie James as Cliff Morgan
 Eddie O'Connell as Jimmy Hammond
 Seamus O'Neill as Harry Travers
 Peter Howitt as Steve Harris
 Peter O'Toole as Barry Newman
 David J. Nichols as Johnny Blair
 Shirley Stelfox as Helen Bunning
 Bhasker Patel as Marway
 John H. Francis as Taffy Davies
 Gareth Marks as Wally Simpkins

Locations
An entrance gate at the Imperial War Museum Duxford in Cambridgeshire stood in for the gates of Depot Para, then the barracks and training facility for the Parachute Regiment at Aldershot in Hampshire. A Douglas C-47 Skytrain from the museum's collection was parked at the gates during filming to replicate the gate guardian at Depot Para in Aldershot.

Episodes

References

External links

1992 British television series debuts
1992 British television series endings
1990s British drama television series
1990s British crime television series
British drama television series
BBC television miniseries
English-language television shows
Serial drama television series
BBC television dramas
BBC Cymru Wales television shows
1990s British television miniseries
Television series by BBC Studios